Ade Shola Oyedele (born 14 September 1984) is a Nigerian former professional footballer who made 37 league appearances for Wimbledon – and its successor club Milton Keynes Dons – between 2003 and 2006. He later played non-League football for Woking and Wingate & Finchley.

References

External links

1984 births
Living people
Nigerian footballers
Wimbledon F.C. players
Milton Keynes Dons F.C. players
Woking F.C. players
Wingate & Finchley F.C. players
Sportspeople from Kano
Association football defenders